Lalitpur 3 is one of three parliamentary constituencies of Lalitpur District in Nepal. This constituency came into existence on the Constituency Delimitation Commission (CDC) report submitted on 31 August 2017.

Incorporated areas 
Lalitpur 3 parliamentary constituency consists of wards 1-5,10,13,14,15,18 and 20-29 of Lalitpur Metropolitan City and ward 12 and 14 of Godawari Municipality.

Assembly segments 
It encompasses the following Bagmati Provincial Assembly segment

 Lalitpur 3(A)
 Lalitpur 3(B)

Members of Parliament

Parliament/Constituent Assembly

Provincial Assembly

3(A)

3(B)

Election results

Election in the 2020s

2022 general election

Election in the 2010s

2017 legislative elections

2017 Nepalese provincial elections

3(A)

3(B)

2013 Constituent Assembly election

Election in the 2000s

2008 Constituent Assembly election

Election in the 1990s

1999 legislative elections

1994 legislative elections

1991 legislative elections

See also 

 List of parliamentary constituencies of Nepal

References

External links 

 Constituency map of Lalitpur

Parliamentary constituencies of Nepal